"2112" (pronounced twenty-one twelve) is a song by the Canadian rock band Rush. It was released as a 20 minute song on their 1976 album of the same name. The overture and the first section, "The Temples of Syrinx", were released as a single and have been featured in most of Rush's setlists since. Starting with the 1996-97 Test for Echo Tour, when any parts of the song were performed live, they were transposed down one full step, as heard on every live album and DVD from Different Stages forward.
With the combined movements being twenty minutes and thirty-three seconds long, it is the longest song or suite in Rush's library. The song was adapted into a comic booklet, which used the lyrics of the song as lines for the characters and the narrations from the cover as intros.

Parts 

 (*) Starting times and lengths approximate.

Composition

This song is described in the liner notes of the album—its interior and back cover—in two ways:
 by the actually-sung lyrics, and
 by the narrative of the song's Protagonist—identified as "Anonymous, 2112"—quoted and italicized like entries from a personal journal—on the back cover and before the lyrics of all songs except "Overture" and "Grand Finale".

Lyricist/drummer Neil Peart is credited in the liner notes as acknowledging "the genius of Ayn Rand." Neil Peart explained the influence that she had on his music, saying in a 1991 "Rockline" interview:

I Overture
The "sci-fi" sounds in the beginning of the song were created using an ARP Odyssey synthesizer and an Echoplex tape delay. On the "2112 / Moving Pictures" episode of the documentary series Classic Albums, producer Terry Brown states the synth intro is composed of various parts played by Hugh Syme that were put together in a collage. This part musically foreshadows the rest of the song—incorporating movements from "The Temples of Syrinx", "Presentation", "Oracle: The Dream", and "Soliloquy"—as well as a guitar adaptation of Tchaikovsky's 1812 Overture. Its sole lyric, at the end, "And the meek shall inherit the Earth", is a reference to the Beatitudes of the New Testament and Psalm 37:11.

II The Temples of Syrinx
The song introduces life within the "Solar Federation" under control of the "Priests of the Temples of Syrinx". The computerized nature of The Priests' system was a concept envisioned by Neil Peart in the 1970s. 

It was released as a single, and Record World said that Rush's "brand of hard, heavy metal, as put forth in this rocker, should soon find a place on the pop airwaves."

III Discovery
The Protagonist finds a guitar in a cave by a waterfall. He figures out how to tune and play it, enabling him to make his own music. He states "How different it could be from the music of the Temples." He decides to perform it before the Priests, believing they will "praise my name" for letting "[the people] make their own music". In this song, guitarist Alex Lifeson builds up from simple open string guitar playing into increasingly complex patterns and chords, showing the man's progress as he teaches himself to play the guitar. Printed on the album were the lyrics "Chords that build high like a mountain" and Geddy sang it this way for the 1996 live album, but the original recorded lyrics were "sounds" instead of "chords" ("sounds that build...").

IV Presentation
The Protagonist performs before the Priests, but they tell him that "we have no need for ancient ways", and dismiss the instrument as a "silly whim" that "doesn't fit the plan". The Protagonist tries to explain, "our world could use this beauty; just think what we might do". However, the Priests tell him, "Don't annoy us further." Vocalist/bassist Geddy Lee and guitarist Alex Lifeson alternately represent the Protagonist with gentle, low-pitched vocals and clean guitar, and the Priests with high-pitched vocals and distorted, hard rock guitar. The song ends with a guitar solo.

V Oracle: The Dream
The Protagonist "wanders home" and has a vision of the past and future. An oracle shows him the way it was before the Federation rose, a society where creativity and individuality flourished, with great "sculptured" works of beauty driven by "the pure spirit of man." He now sees that without these things, life has become "meaningless." He also sees "the hand of man arise with hungry mind and open eyes". The "elder race" was not destroyed, but "left our planets long ago", plotting to ultimately return "home to tear the Temples down."

VI Soliloquy
The protagonist returns to the cave and broods for "days". He imagines "what my life might be in a world like I have seen", and now considers life under the Federation "cold and empty", with his spirits "low in the depths of despair". He resolves that, in order to "pass into the world of my dream, and know peace at last", he must take his own life, his narrative ending as "my life blood spills over."

VII Grand Finale
The song concludes with a hard rock instrumental part. Pingree's Music Reviews says, "'2112' ends with the oppressive government being attacked by another entity, left entirely up to the listener's interpretation." On the Classic Albums episode on 2112 and Moving Pictures, Lee comments on the ambiguity of the ending, but Peart states that his intent was that the Elder Race successfully deposed the Solar Federation. As the Grand Finale ends, the lines "Attention all planets of the Solar Federation" followed by "We have assumed control" are spoken three times each.

Popular culture
This song is on Guitar Hero: Warriors of Rock where it is used within the game's storyline (four band warriors find Demigod's Battle Axe Guitar and must play all parts of "2112" on basic controllers). The level is narrated by Rush.

It was made available to download on December 31, 2011 as both 3 pieces and as the complete 20-minute track, for play in Rock Band 3 Basic, and PRO mode which utilizes real guitar / bass guitar, and MIDI compatible electronic drum kits in addition to vocals.

The song and its universe feature in the novel Ready Player One by Ernest Cline as fundamental plot elements, and also get a visual reference in its film adaptation.

See also
 List of Rush songs

Notes

References

1976 singles
1976 songs
Rush (band) songs
Dystopian music
Songs written by Alex Lifeson
Songs written by Geddy Lee
Songs written by Neil Peart
Song recordings produced by Terry Brown (record producer)
Science fiction music
Rock operas